The 1969 Western Championships, also known as the Cincinnati Open, was a tennis tournament played on outdoor clay courts at the Cincinnati Tennis Club in Cincinnati, Ohio in the United States. The tournament was held from July 14 through July 21, 1969. Third-seeded Cliff Richey won the men's singles title and the accompanying $5,000 first-prize money. Lesley Turner Bowrey won the women's singles title.

Finals

Men's singles
 Cliff Richey defeated  Allan Stone 6–1, 6–2

Women's singles
 Lesley Turner Bowrey defeated  Gail Chanfreau 1–6, 7–5, 10–10 ret.

Men's doubles
 Bob Lutz /  Stan Smith defeated  Arthur Ashe /  Charlie Pasarell 6–3, 6–4

Women's doubles
 Kerry Harris /  Valerie Ziegenfuss defeated  Emilie  Burrer /  Pam Richmond 6–3, 9–7

References

External links
 
 ATP tournament profile
 ITF tournament edition details

Cincinnati Masters
Cincinnati Open
Cincinnati Open
Cincinnati Open
Cincinnati Open